The 1916 United States Senate election in Delaware took place on November 7, 1916.

Incumbent Republican Senator Henry A. du Pont ran for re-election to a third term in office, but was defeated by Democrat Josiah O. Wolcott.

General election

Candidates
Hiram R. Burton, former Republican U.S. Representative from Sussex County (Progressive)
Henry A. du Pont, incumbent Senator since 1906 (Republican)
William C. Ferris (Socialist)
Josiah O. Wolcott, Delaware Attorney General (Democratic)

Results

See also 
 1916 United States Senate elections

References

 

Delaware
1916
1916 Delaware elections